Paul Guiraud (15 January 1850 – 25 February 1907) was a French historian born in Cenne-Monestiés, a commune located in the department of Aude. He was the brother of historian Jean Guiraud.

Paul Guiraud was a professor of Greek history to the faculties at Douai and Toulouse, and later a lecturer at the École Normale Supérieure. In 1906 he was elected a member of the Académie des Sciences Morales et Politiques.

Written works 
Among his better written efforts were an 1896 biography of his former teacher, Fustel de Coulanges (1830–1889), and a work titled "Vie privée et la vie publique des Grecs" (Private and public life in ancient Greece). Other written works by Guiraud include:
 Le Différend entre César et le Sénat (59-49 av. J.-C.) (Differences between Caesar and the Senate (59-49 BC), (1878). 
 Les Assemblées provinciales dans l'Empire romain (The provincial assemblies in the Roman Empire), (1887). 
 La Propriété foncière en Grèce jusqu'à la conquête romaine (Greek regions prior to the Roman Conquest), (1893).
 La Main-d'œuvre industrielle dans l'ancienne Grèce (Industrial labor in Ancient Greece), (1900).
 Études économiques sur l'antiquité (Economic studies on antiquity), (1905).

References 
 This article is based on a translation of an equivalent article at the French Wikipedia.

External links
 

19th-century French historians
20th-century French historians
1850 births
1907 deaths
People from Aude
Members of the Académie des sciences morales et politiques
French male non-fiction writers